Hayedeh Safiyari (born 27 June 1959) is an Iranian film editor and a member of the Academy of Motion Picture Arts and Sciences.

She graduated in Art Cinema from a reputed University in Iran and decided to pursue her professional career in movie editing. Immediately after graduating from the university, she was recruited in the national TV of Iran. The majority of the edits she has carried out are for internationally well-known filmmakers such as Asghar Farhadi, Bahram Beyzai, Bahman Ghobadi, Rakhshan Banietemad, Reza Dormishian, Alireza Raeesian, Shahram Alidi, and Pooran Derakhshande. She is best known for her long-time collaborations with Iranian director Asghar Farhadi, including the Oscar-winning A Separation and The Salesman.

She has receive several precious awards namely, the Crystal Simorgh, the Statue of the Cinema House, Asian Film Award, Fajr film festival, Iran’s film Critics & Writers Association; and Nominated for Cinema Writers Circle award and Goya International Cinephile Society award. She extended her professional work to many countries, including USA, France, Spain, Italy, Sweaden, and Turkey.

Safiyari has edited over 80 feature fiction films and several documentaries over the thirty years. Most of these films have been selected and Nominated by many well-world film festivals and received prestigious awards. This includes “Cannes film festival”, “BFI”, “Berlin international film festival”, “Venice international film festival”, “Golden Globe”, and “Locarno international film festival”. Two of the films she contributed as Film Editor, The Salesman (2016) and A Separation (2011), both directed by Asghar Farhadi, have been awarded in Oscar Academy as the best foreign-language film.

She was awarded Best Editing in the 6th Asian Film Awards for A Separation.

Editing 
 A Hero
A Dragon Arrives!
A Man without a Shadow
I'm Not Angry!
Simulation
 Everybody Knows (film)
 The Salesman (2016 film)
 A Separation
 About Elly
 Fireworks Wednesday
 Marooned in Iraq
 Lantouri
 I'm Not Angry!
 Hush! Girls Don't Scream
 Hatred (2012 film)
 Good to Be Back
 Modest Reception
 Whisper with the Wind
 Dayere Zangi
 Turtles Can Fly
 Low Heights
 The Red Ribbon
 The Glass Agency
 Under the Smoky Roof

References

External links

1960 births
Living people
People from Gorgan
Iranian film editors
Persian cinema articles needing an image
Persian cinema articles needing attention
20th-century Iranian women
21st-century Iranian women